Simone Bacciocchi (born 22 January 1977) is a Sammarinese footballer who formerly played for Sporting Novafeltria and numerous other clubs in San Marino.

Bacciocchi made 60 appearances for the San Marino national football team.

References

External links
 

1977 births
Living people
Sammarinese footballers
Association football defenders
San Marino international footballers
F.C. Domagnano players
Competitors at the 1997 Mediterranean Games
Mediterranean Games competitors for San Marino